Julie Madison Suk ( Gaillard; born 1924) is an American prize-winning poet and writer from Charlotte, North Carolina. She is the author of six volumes of poetry - The Medicine Woman (St. Andrews Press, 1980), Heartwood (Briarpatch Press, 1991), The Angel of Obsession (The University of Arkansas Press, 1992), The Dark Takes Aim (Autumn House Press, 2003), Lie Down With Me (Autumn House Press, 2011), and Astonished To Wake (Jacar Press, 2016), and co-editor of Bear Crossings: an Anthology of North American Poets. She is included in The Autumn House Anthology of Contemporary American Poetry. Her poems have appeared in many literary journals including The Georgia Review, Great River Review, The Laurel Review, Ploughshares, Poetry, Shenandoah, and TriQuarterly.

Life and career 
Suk was born and raised in Mobile, Alabama in 1924. She attended Stephens College and the University of Alabama. In 1944 she married naval officer William Joseph Suk, who later founded the Charlotte engineering services company Polytech Services, Inc. shortly after the couple and their three children Julie, Bill, and Palmer moved from Shaker Heights, Ohio to Charlotte in 1966. For many years she was an artist, painting landscapes in oils. It was not until the 1960s that Suk took up poetry, inspired in part by the work of French poet Saint-John Perse. She has lived in Charlotte since 1966.

Awards 
 In 2004 Julie Suk received the Irene Blair Honeycutt Lifetime Achievement Award from Central Piedmont Community College
 The Dark Takes Aim won the 2003 North Carolina Poetry Society’s Brockman-Campbell Book Award and The Oscar Arnold Young Award from The Poetry Council of North Carolina.
 Julie Suk was awarded the 1993 Bess Hokin Prize from Poetry magazine.
 The Angel of Obsession won the 1992 Arkansas Poetry Award and the Roanoke-Chowan Poetry Award.

Works

Poetry collections 
 
 
 
 
 
                          Astonished To Wake: Poems. Jacar Press, Durham NC. 2016.

In anthologies

References

External links 
 Charlotte Observer:  The Reading Life, More poems from Julie Suk, January 5, 2012
 The Pilot:  Tracing Writer's Roots Through Poems, by Ruth Moose, February 12, 2012

1924 births
Living people
21st-century American women
American women poets
Stephens College alumni
University of Alabama alumni